St Publius' Chapel is a small Roman Catholic church located in the village of Għasri in Gozo, Malta. Even though the chapel is in the village of Għasri, it is under the jurisdiction and administration of the parish of Għarb, its neighbouring village.

Original Chapel
A chapel dedicated to St Leonard was built around 1550 by George Tewma which had an adjoining cemetery. It was deconsecrated by Bishop Miguel Juan Balaguer Camarasa in 1654. The chapel was demolished a few years later in 1657.

Present Chapel
The cornerstone of the present chapel was laid on July 26, 1850 through initiatives of Reverend Guzepp Cassar and it was finished and blessed by the Archpriest of Gharb on October 10, 1852. It was built through expenses made by the rector of a neighbouring chapel of the Assumption, which became popularly known as Ta' Pinu. The chapel was dedicated to Saint Publius, Malta's first bishop, rather than St Leonard, as was the original chapel.

Interior
The chapel has one marble altar and a painting depicting St Publius. Other works of art include two other paintings depicting the Assumption of Mary and Mary as the Immaculate Conception, respectively.

References

17th-century Roman Catholic church buildings in Malta
Roman Catholic chapels in Malta
Għasri
National Inventory of the Cultural Property of the Maltese Islands